Kostas Rigopoulos (22 November 1930 – 14 January 2001) was a Greek actor.

Biography

Kostas Rigopoulos was born in Athens in November 1930 and graduated from the Drama School of the National Theatre in 1953.

He appeared for the first time on stage at the Kyveli Theater (Cybele) in the work of Oscar Wilde. It was there he met the 18-year-old Kakia Analyti, whom he later married.  They raised a daughter, actress Zoi Rigopoulou.

Later on, he appeared alongside other established actors and actresses, including Lambeti, Katerina, Katrakis, Horn.

From 1962, he ran his own company with his wife, at the Diana Theatre in which a year later ran her own theatre, the Analyti Theatre.

Rigopoulos appeared in the cinema when he was a child.  With the work To proxenio tis Annas (Το προξενιό της Άννας = Annas's Consulate, by Pantelis Voulgaris) won the Honorary Award at the Thessaloniki International Film Festival.

He also appeared on television on the Greek serial Axiomatikos Ypiresias (Αξιωματικός Υπηρεσίας), Viva Katerina (Βίβα Κατερίνα), Hamoyelaste parakalo (Χαμογελάστε παρακαλώ), in 1988, he was also a presenter for a game show called Essis ti lete (Εσείς τι λέτε)

He later lived by himself in Palaio Faliro southwest of Athens and also spoke English and French.

He died from a major stroke which he suffered 6 months earlier.

Filmography
partial list

1965: Praktores 005 enantion Hrysopodarou (Πράκτορες 005 εναντίον Χρυσοπόδαρου)
Mia porta drh. 500 (Μια πόρτα δρχ. …500 = A door with 500 Drachmas) by B. Goufas and V. Andreopoulou
I vila ton orgion (Η Βίλα των οργίων) by Geras. Stavrou
'Eimaste oloi synypeythynoi" Pavel Kohout
"Lady from Maxim" Georges Feydeau
I Zodohira (Η Ζωντοχήρα) a work by Ibrohoris and G. Papas
"Agapimou Ouaoua" Franois Campeau in which had a greater and longer theatrical success from 1967 until 1973.
To afti tou Alexandrou (Το αυτί του Αλέξανδρου = Alexander's Ears) by Kostas Mourselas
 Suki Yaki (Stone - Cooney, a great success of the time)
An Unnamed Tale (Παραμύθι χωρίς όνομα = Paramithi horis onoma) by Iakovos Kampanellis
Vassilikos (Βασιλικός) by Kostandinos Matessis

Notes and references

Bibliography
Who's Who 1979, p 595

External links

1930 births
2001 deaths
Male actors from Athens
Greek male film actors
20th-century Greek male actors